Richard Ayoun  (born 23 January 1948 in Algeria, died on 30 May 2008 in Paris, France) was a professor at University of Paris, Institut National des Langues et Civilisations Orientales (INALCO), Jewish historian and lecturer in Sephardic language and civilization.

Works consulted 
 Typologie d’une carrière rabbinique L’exemple de Mahir Charleville, in Presses Universitaires de Nancy, 1993, 2 vol., 1004 p.
 Les Juifs de France de l’émancipation à l’intégration (1787–1812), in L’Harmattan, coll. « Judaïsmes », 1997, 320 p.
 Un Grand rabbin au XIXe siècle : Mahir Charleville 1814-1888, in Cerf, 1999, 545 p.
 The Judeo-Spanish people : Itineraries of a community, Paris,  in JEAA, March 2003, 82 p.

References

External links
Photo of Prof. Ayoun

1948 births
2008 deaths
French male non-fiction writers
20th-century French historians
20th-century French male writers